The following are the national records in Olympic weightlifting in Mauritius. Records are maintained in each weight class for the snatch lift, clean and jerk lift, and the total for both lifts by the Mauritius Amateur Weightlifters and Powerlifters Association.

Current records

Men

Women

Historical records

Women (1998–2018)

References

Mauritius
Olympic weightlifting
Weightlifting